Karachi Circular Railway (abbreviated as KCR)   (Sindhi: ڪراچي سرڪيولر ريلوي) is a partially active regional public transit system in Karachi, Sindh, Pakistan, which serves the Karachi metropolitan area. KCR was fully operational between 1964 to 1994, until it was abruptly shutdown in 1999. Since 2001, several restart attempts were sought and in November 2020, the KCR partially revived operations on the orders of Supreme Court of Pakistan.

With its hub at Karachi City station on I. I. Chundrigar Road, KCR's revived operations would extend north to Gadap, east to Dhabeji, south to Kiamari and west to Hub in Balochistan. The revived KCR operation is intended to become an inter-regional public transit system in Karachi, with an aim to connect the city centre with several industrial and commercial districts within the city and the outlying localities. Revival efforts of KCR had been proposed several times since becoming defunct in 1999 and remained unfulfilled mainly due to lack of financial and political backing. In May 2017, the federal government approved a  restoration package for the KCR, however delays and disputes with the Sindh provincial government ultimately led to the cancellation of the funding.

In August 2020, the federal government approved a  rehabilitation package for the KCR restoration. The funding is slated to cover only phase one and phase two of KCR's restoration project, similar to the restoration of the Karachi-Peshawar Railway Line, according to Ameer Muhammad Daudpota.

History
Karachi Circular Railway came into being during President Ayub Khan's tenure, who suggested the use of trains as a means for short travel in Karachi. KCR Operations began in 1964 under the administration of Pakistan Railways, with the aims to provide better transportation facilities to Karachi's growing population and outlying surrounding suburban communities. The original KCR line extended from Karachi City station and ended at Drigh Road station and carried 6 million passengers that year. Its instant success made Pakistan Railways a significant profit in its first year of operation. In 1970, KCR was expanded further east to Landhi Junction station while new track was extended westwards, thus opening Karachi Port Trust Halt station and Wazir Mansion station in 1970. Throughout the 1970s, track was further extended westwards and northwards towards North Nazimabad, forming a "loop line" which circled around several of Karachi's residential and industrial areas. At its peak, KCR ran 104 daily trains, of which 80 trains ran on the main line, while the remaining 24 trains ran on the loop line. During the 1990s, cost of operations increased while revenues dropped due to a deteriorating commuter service and increasing culture of fare dodging. Private transporters during this time also contracted KCR staff and by 1994 KCR was in incurring major losses due to mismanagement. As a result, the vast majority of trains were discontinued with only a few running on the loop. Unable to withstand the pressures of a growing transport mafia, Pakistan Railways abandoned the KCR in 1999. The official reason for the discontinuation was that Pakistan Railways was said to be making a loss by running the trains all over the city with few passengers taking advantage of the facility. Another version suggests that private transporters conspired with some corrupt staffers in the railways to fulfill their desire to bag the bulk of passengers for themselves The result caused instant gridlock on Karachi's streets. Severe criticisms were lodged at Pakistan Railways mismanagement as well as Karachi's "road transport mafia". In 2005, revival plans for the KCR were initiated to fulfill the growing transportation needs of Karachi, but never fully materialized. In 2009, the Karachi Urban Transport Corporation was proposed  in which KCR would be operated as a semi-autonomous body. Pakistan Railways would have 60% share in the corporation, Sindh government 25% and Karachi 15%.

Route
The KCR will consist of a loop line from Karachi City to Drigh Road via Liaquatabad. 44 kilometres will be revived with an additional 6 kilometre elevated dual track from Karachi City to Jinnah International Airport, allowing the KCR to connect to the Pakistan Railway main line. Existing railway tracks and 30 stations would be completely rebuilt on bridges. KCR would be used by 500,000 passengers/day which would increase to 1 million in later years. KCR will have 250 modern driverless electric bullet trains which would run 17-hours a day & 7-days a week. This project is also part of CPEC. Total cost of the project would be 294 billion PKR. The KCR would be run by the Sindh Government through Karachi Urban Transport Corporation (KUTC). Construction started in 2022 by FWO and would complete by 2025.

Lines

Main line
 Karachi City
 Karachi Cantonment
 Chanesar Halt
 Karsaz
 Drigh Road > Loop line
 Drigh Colony
 Jinnah International Airport
 Malir > Malir line
 Landhi Junction
 Jummah Goth
 Bin Qasim Port
 Gaddar
 Dabheji

Loop line
 Depot Hill
 Karachi University
 Urdu College 
 Gilani
 Liaqatabad 
 North Nazimabad
 Manghopir
 SITE
 Shah Abdul Latif
 Baldia
 Lyari
 Wazir Mansion
 Karachi Port Trust Halt

Malir line
 Malir Colony
 Malir Cantonment

Encroachments
Around 7650 structures, including 4653 houses, are illegally built on 67 acres out of 360-acre land required for the KCR.

Revival Timeline
The KCR was originally designed according to the 1964 Karachi Master Plan, which had to be closed due to loss due to wrong route plan. Now it needs to make a brand new route plan which also separated from national railway line. That will help clear the busiest streets in Karachi.A large amount of criticism has been lodged at supposed "revival efforts" of the KCR. Countless studies and feasibility reports since 2001 has yielded no actual ground work. Several proposals were publicly announced by politicians both in the Government of Sindh and Government of Pakistan, all of which had approved plans and pledged funding. Yet each date passed by without any work commencing. The following is a timeline of statements made by several politicians over the past 15 years, all of whom boldly gave start dates for the KCR project. KCR was originally established in 1964 for:

 24 March 2003: Minister of Railways Ghos Bakhsh Khan Mahar stated that the revival of the KCR had been planned for which feasibility studies and tenders would be floated and awarded to the lowest bidder, adding that the KCR would be operated in the private sector. Nothing materialized after this announcement.
 9 March 2005: Prime Minister Shaukat Aziz inaugurated the first phase of the KCR and claimed the project would be revived in three phases "within a couple of years or so".  was pledged to be spent on the complete renovation of the KCR, however within the year the first phase was shut down.
 30 April 2010: Minister of Railways Ghulam Ahmad Bilour stated construction work would begin in 2010. Stage I and II of the project would commence simultaneously and be completed within three-years and would be open to the public by 2014. This date passed without any work commencing.
 9 April 2012: Karachi Urban Transport Corporation Managing Director, Aijaz Hussain Khilji, stated construction work would begin in June 2013 and hoped it would be completed by June 2017. This date passed without any work commencing.
 8 August 2012: Karachi Metropolitan Corporation Administrator, Muhammad Hussain Syed, stated the study report for restoration of the KCR had been completed and that construction would begin by September 2013. JICA agreed to a  loan to the Karachi Urban Transport Corporation, which would oversee rebuilding and refurbishment of the KCR. The plans called for upgrades and rebuilding of the 50 kilometer long circular loop line which would operate 24 trains facilitating 700,000 commuters, making 3-minute stops at 23 stations. However, this plan never materialized.
 9 December 2016:  Minister of Railways Khawaja Saad Rafique announced that Pakistan Railways would handover administrative control to the Sindh government, but would require KCR property land being allotted for other purposes to be cleared first. Nothing materialized after this announcement.
 30 September 2017: Chief Minister of Sindh, Syed Murad Ali Shah claimed the KCR project would begin on 25 December 2017 after he stated that the KCR route had been cleared of all encroachments and Pakistan Railways was onboard for acquiring 360 acres of land for the KCR right of way. This date passed without any work commencing.
 18 January 2018: Chief Minister of Sindh, Syed Murad Ali Shah backtracked on his initial statement and said that work on the KCR project will begin on 23 March 2018. He stated “I am going to give good news to the people of Karachi who need KCR in March”. This date passed without any work commencing either.
 1 March 2020: Minister of Railways Sheikh Rasheed Ahmed said that the Karachi Circular Railway "will be operationalized in six months" in collaboration with the government of Sindh.
 20 August 2020: KCR was allocated  of the Federal budget of fiscal year 2020–21, while the Sindh provincial budget allocated .
 19 November 2020: Minister of Railways Sheikh Rashid inaugurated the KCR by traveling from Orangi Station to Pipri Yard. The 14 kilometres track runs through six stations and 12 level crossings.
11 February 2021: KCR was further extended to 74-kilometres long track. With the new extension, the service will connect Dhabeji Railway station from outside Karachi till Orangi Town station.
28 September 2021: Prime Minister Imran Khan has broken ground on the $1.22bn (PKR207bn) Karachi Circular Railway (KCR) revival project, which is anticipated to be completed in three years.
28 May 2022: KCR was included in CPEC by Shehbaz Sharif and construction started. Existing 43 km KCR track and stations would be completely rebuilt into world class mass transit system with environment friendly, driverless and electric trains. The route would not be changed however many underpasses and bridges would be built along the route to eliminate 22-level crossings. New KCR would be similar to Lahore's Orange Train. New KCR would have joint stations with Karachi Metrobus at points of intersection. 3 years deadline is given for completion of the project.

See also
 Karachi Tramway
 Lahore Metro
 Pakistan Railways
 Transport in Pakistan

References

External links 
 Karachi Circular Railway Map on flickr.com by Ali Adnan Qazalbash Designed on October 4, 2009
 Karachi Circular Railway System Approved by Federal Government 4 September 2009 : Article by Moid Ansari
 Karachi Circular Railway System to be revived by 2011 - APP
 KUTS come to exietence after its registration with SEC - APP
 Mass transit conundrum
 Revival of Karachi Circular Railway: ANALYSIS
 Pakistan Railway Discussion Group at Yahoo Pakistan Railway Discussion Group at Yahoo]
 A Web Site about KCR by Adnan Zafar
 KCR projected on Google Maps
 Master Plan Map of Karachi Circular Railway

Railway loop lines
Transport in Karachi
Regional rail in Pakistan
Proposed public transport in Pakistan
5 ft 6 in gauge railways in Pakistan